The Cadillac CT5 is a mid-size luxury car manufactured and marketed by General Motors under the Cadillac brand.

Overview

The CT5 debuted at the 2019 New York Auto Show. Unlike its predecessor, the CTS, and the flagship CT6, the CT5's fastback body style draws inspiration from the Cadillac fastback models from the late 1940s. The CT5 went on sale in the fall of 2019 and is available in four trim levels (Luxury, Premium Luxury, Sport, and V).

In 2021, Cadillac began offering their semi-autonomous driving system, Super Cruise, as an optional feature. The Super Cruise package costs additional $2,500, and is the second generation of Super Cruise technology, adding lane change on demand.

The CT5 went on sale in the U.S. in the fourth quarter of 2019 with a starting price of $36,895. In Canada, the starting price was $41,998.

CT5-V

Cadillac unveiled the high-performance CT5-V on May 30, 2019, alongside the Cadillac CT4-V. It replaced the CTS-V Sport and the XTS-V Sport. In the U.S., it carried a starting price of $47,695 for 2020. 

The CT5-V came with MagneRide (GM Magnetic Ride Control) starting with the 2020 model.

CT5-V Blackwing

Upon release, it was announced by Cadillac that the CT5-V Blackwing, alongside the smaller CT4-V Blackwing, would be the last gasoline powered V models that Cadillac would produce.

The Cadillac CT5-V Blackwing is also available with carbon-ceramic Brembo brakes. The optional carbon-ceramic system (which is copper-free) is around  lighter than the standard cast-iron system. This is the first time Cadillac has offered a carbon-ceramic brake package.

Sales

See also
Cadillac CT4

References

External links
Cadillac CT5 official website

CT5
Executive cars
Sports sedans
All-wheel-drive vehicles
Rear-wheel-drive vehicles
Cars introduced in 2019
2020s cars